The 1901 Wimbledon Championships took place on the outdoor grass courts at the All England Lawn Tennis and Croquet Club in Wimbledon, London, United Kingdom. The tournament ran from 24 June until 3 July. It was the 25th staging of the Wimbledon Championships, and the first Grand Slam tennis event of 1901. There was a record entry of thirty competitors in the women's singles.

This was the first Wimbledon tournament during the reign of King Edward VII.

Finals

Men's singles

 Arthur Gore defeated  Reginald Doherty 4–6, 7–5, 6–4, 6–4

Women's singles

 Charlotte Sterry defeated  Blanche Hillyard 6–2, 6–2

Men's doubles

 Laurence Doherty /  Reginald Doherty defeated  Dwight Davis /  Holcombe Ward 4–6, 6–2, 6–3, 9–7

References

External links
 Official Wimbledon Championships website

 
Wimbledon Championships
Wimbledon Championships
Wimbledon Championships
Wimbledon Championships
1901 in English tennis